La La Land is an American television comedy series broadcast on Showtime in the United States, BBC Three in the United Kingdom, and SBS One in Australia. It features character comedian Marc Wootton playing three different characters: Shirley Ghostman, a fake psychic; Gary Garner, a wannabe actor; and Brendan Allen, a documentary film-maker.

Release
The series was first broadcast on 25 January 2010. It was released on DVD on 7 June 2010.

Reception 
On Rotten Tomatoes, the series holds an approval rating of 57% based on 7 reviews, with an average rating of 2/10.

The series received mixed reviews by critics. Mike Hale of the New York Times gave a favorable review, writing "while he doesn’t often inspire the helpless laughter that Borat or Da Ali G Show provoke, his quieter, more slowly building situations can have their own devastating payoffs." Heather Havrilesky of Salon praised the dark comedy and narrative, describing the series as capturing "the jackassery inherent to striving." Brian Lowry of Variety gave an unfavorable review, describing Wootton as "poor man's Sacha Baron Cohen" and writing of the series "while Wootton's irreverent antics are sporadically funny enough to win him a cult following, the memorable moments ultimately prove too few and far between."

References

External links
 La La Land at Showtime.com
 
 Fooling Nobody Marc Wootton's official site and blog

2010s American comedy television series
2010 American television series debuts
2010 American television series endings
English-language television shows
BBC television comedy
Showtime (TV network) original programming